Sophia Turkiewicz is an Australian film and television director known for her film Silver City. Silver City, which Turkiewicz began during a six-month stay in Poland,  was released internationally and won 3 AFI awards. Turkiewicz has also spent six years as a lecturer in the directing department of the Australian Film, Television and Radio School before leaving to direct Once My Mother.

Filmography

Film
A Handful of Jelly Babies (1976)
Letters from Poland (1978) 
Silver City (1984)   
Flame (1995)
Pacific Drive (1996)
Once My Mother (2013). Short-listed for the 2015 Betty Roland Prize for Scriptwriting, New South Wales Premier's Literary Awards.

Television
Time's Raging (1985)
I've Come About the Suicide (1987)
The New Adventures of Black Beauty (1992, episodes Sweet Reward and The Detectives)
Bananas in Pyjamas (1992, 37 episodes)
A Country Practice (1994, episodes Little Girl Lost and Family Business)
Mirror, Mirror (1995, season 1, episodes 6 - 10 and 16 - 20)
The Wayne Manifesto (1996, director of 4 episodes)
Driven Crazy (1998, episodes 1–4)
Something in the Air (2001, eight episodes)
Escape of the Artful Dodger (2002, six episodes)

References

External links
 

Living people
Australian film directors
Australian women film directors
Year of birth missing (living people)